Michael Damaskenos or Michail Damaskenos (1530/35–1592/93) was a leading post-Byzantine Cretan painter. He is a major representative of the Cretan School of painting that flourished in the 16th and 17th centuries.  Painters Georgios Klontzas and Damaskenos were major contributors to the Cretan School during the same period.  Damaskinos traveled all over the Venetian Empire painting.  He remained loyal to his Greek roots stylistically but incorporated some Italian elements in his work.  He was strongly influenced by the Venetian school.  He painted parts of the Cathedral of San Giorgio dei Greci.  Damaskenos has 100 known works.  He influenced the works of Theodore Poulakis.

Life and work 
  Damaskinos was born in Candia (Herakleion), his father was George Damaskinos.  According to legend, Damaskinos spent some time living and working in Vrontisi Monastery, where six of his icons were kept until 1800. Damaskinos moved to Venice in the 1560s, while he was there he learned miniature painting.

He traveled extensively throughout Italy.  From contracts we know he briefly stayed in Sicily from 1569 to 1571.  Afterward, he traveled back to Venice.  He was a member of the Greek Brotherhood of Venice from 1577 to 1582.  He painted icons for the Greek Orthodox Cathedral of San Giorgio dei Greci in Venice.  He tried to become a member of the council of the confraternity.  He was unsuccessful.  During the same period, he worked for both Catholic institutions and executed private commissions.

He became friends with sculptor Alessandro Vittoria.  He sold a collection of drawings to him which he amassed from other Italian artists.  Namely the Mannerist Parmigianino.  He was also familiar with Palma Giovane and may have had some contact with the workshop of Tintoretto. Some of his works are clearly influenced by Paolo Veronese, 
Tintoretto and Titian.  Many of the Greek painters were influenced by the Venetian school.  He returned to Candia around 1583.
 
His only daughter Antonia married painter Ioannis Mavrikas-Mandouphos or Yannas Mantoufos.  Damaskinos stayed in Greece and worked mainly in Crete and the Ionian Islands.  He was invited to return to Venice by the Greek Orthodox Confraternity.  They wanted to commission him to paint the dome of San Giorgio dei Greci.  He declined the invitations for personal reasons.  Extensive work was later completed at the church San Giorgio dei Greci by famous painter Emmanuel Tzane-Bounialis.  He was influenced by Damaskinos.

Damaskinos works were characteristic of the traditional Byzantine style.  He used a particular rose color that characterized his paintings, his figure dimensions were defined by only a few brush strokes.  He drew on wood but never marble thrones which was typical in the Cretan School. Damaskinos was also the first artist to introduce paler flesh tones to post-Byzantine painting and it was one of the stylistic features of his work which proved highly influential from the second half of the sixteenth century and onwards. 

Damaskinos signed his works: ΧΕΙΡ ΜΙΧΑΗΛ ΤΟΥ ΔΑΜΑΣΚΗΝΟΥ or ΧΕΙΡ ΜΙΧΑΗΛ ΔΑΜΑΣΚΗΝΟΥ, ΔΑΜΑΣΚΗΝΟΥ ΜΙΧΑΗΛ ΧΕΙΡ or even ΠΟΙΗΜΑ ΜΙΧΑΗΛ ΤΟΥ ΔΑΜΑΣΚΗΝΟΥ (creation of Michael Damaskinos). Damaskinos worked extensively on the Ionian Islands.  He contributed to the fusion of the Cretan and the Heptanese School of painting.  He influenced the works of Theodore Poulakis.  Famous Greek Painter and theorist Panagiotis Doxaras in his book The Art of Painting published in 1720 considered Damaskinos to be one of the most important painters.

San Giorgio dei Greci

Twenty-five of his major paintings are located in Venice.  Damaskinos completed works for the church San Giorgio dei Greci between 1560-1583.  Twenty of his works are part of the church San Giorgio dei Greci.  Eighteen of his paintings are part of the iconostasis.  The Archangel Michael is portrayed in one of the icons.  The dodekaorto also known as the Great feasts in the Eastern Orthodox Church is featured in nine of the paintings.  Two of his paintings are behind the iconostasis within the holy sanctuary.  The Hellenic Institute of Venice has four of his paintings.  The research facility and museum are associated with San Giorgio dei Greci.  One of his paintings Wedding at Cana is part of the collection at the Museo Correr in Venice.

Gallery

Traditional

Venetian Cretan School

Notable Works
The Last Supper (Damaskinos)
Wedding at Cana (Damaskinos)
Crucifixion of Saint Andrew (Damaskinos)
Adoration of the Kings (Damaskinos)
Stoning of Stephen (Damaskinos)
Virgin of the Burning Bush (Damaskinos)
Tribute to the Eucharist (Damaskinos)

See also 
 Cretan School
 Heptanese School
 Byzantine art
 Maniera greca

External links 
 Museum of St. Catherine/Museum of Christian Art in Heraklion
 The painter Michael Damaskenos
 Cretan Icon Painting up to the Fall of Candia
 The work of Michael Damaskinos by S. Peponakis-in Greek
 Istituto Ellenico di Studi Byzantini and Postbyzantini di Venezia
 Collection of Agia Aikaterini of Sinai
Byzantium: faith and power (1261-1557), an exhibition catalog from The Metropolitan Museum of Art (fully available online as PDF), which contains material on Damaskinos (see index)

References

Bibliography

1530s births
1590s deaths
Greek painters
Artists from Heraklion
Cretan Renaissance painters
16th-century Greek people
Place of death unknown
16th-century Greek painters